Oak Hill, built in 1853, is an historic home located at 26 Aspen Street in Calvert City, Kentucky. It was built by Potilla Calvert, the founder of Calvert City and the man for whom the city was named. It was named a historic Kentucky landmark in August 1973. On December 31, 1974, it was added to the National Register of Historic Places.

The present appearance of the house was created in 1949 when any Victorian era features were removed or hidden.  A two-story four-column portico with a second floor iron balcony and a Georgian style door frame were then added.

References

Houses on the National Register of Historic Places in Kentucky
Houses in Marshall County, Kentucky
National Register of Historic Places in Marshall County, Kentucky
1853 establishments in Kentucky
Houses completed in 1853